Quinze & Milan Designers is a Belgian cult design label of designer furniture founded by Belgian conceptual artist Arne Quinze and Yves Milan, who has since left the company, in 1999.

Products
The company's basic product range consists of pieces for use in public areas, homes and offices. 

In 1999, Primary Pouf 01, a block of brightly colored polyurethane foam on legs, kicked off the use of coated foam. The label nowadays features as well various collections in wood, fabrics, steel, PE and concrete.

Since 2020, SDC Lab is the exclusive licensee of the Quinze & Milan brand and collection.

References

External links
Quinze & Milan official site 
SDC Lab official site

Belgian brands
Belgian furniture designers
Manufacturing companies established in 1999
Privately held companies of Belgium
Furniture companies of Belgium
Companies based in West Flanders
1999 establishments in Belgium